Neiqiu County is a county in southwest of Hebei province, People's Republic of China, bordering Shanxi province to the west. The county seat is located in Neiqiu Town.

Administrative divisions
Neiqiu consists of 5 towns and 4 townships.

Towns:
Neiqiu, Damengcun, Jindian, Guanzhuang, Liulin

Townships:
Wuguodian Township, Nanzhai Township, Zhangmao Township, Houjiazhuang Township

Climate

References

County-level divisions of Hebei
Xingtai